5F-AMB (also known as 5F-MMB-PINACA and 5F-AMB-PINACA) is an indazole-based synthetic cannabinoid from the indazole-3-carboxamide family, which has been used as an active ingredient in synthetic cannabis products. It was first identified in Japan in early 2014.
Although only very little pharmacological information about 5F-AMB itself exists, its 4-cyanobutyl analogue (instead of 5-fluoropentyl) has been reported to be a potent agonist for the CB1 receptor (KI = 0.7 nM).

Side effects

5F-AMB intoxication caused one fatality on its own, another through ketoacidosis in combination with AB-CHMINACA, AB-FUBINACA, AM-2201, 5F-APINACA, EAM-2201, JWH-018, JWH-122, MAM-2201, STS-135 and THJ-2201 and another fatality in combination with AB-CHMINACA and Diphenidine.

Legality

In the United States, 5F-AMB is a Schedule I controlled substance.

5F-AMB is an Anlage II controlled substance in Germany as of May 2015.

Sweden's public health agency suggested classifying 5F-AMB as hazardous substance on November 10, 2014.

The state of Louisiana banned 5F-AMB through an emergency rule after it was detected in a synthetic cannabinoids product called "Kali Berry 2" on 3 June 2014.

5F-AMB is controlled by the Fifth Schedule of the Misuse of Drugs Act (MDA) in Singapore as of May 2015.

5F-AMB was also scheduled in Japan on July 25, 2014.

As of October 2015 5F-AMB is a controlled substance in China.

In December of 2019, the UNODC announced scheduling recommendations placing 5F-MMB-PINACA as a Schedule II controlled research chemical.

See also

 5F-AB-PINACA
 5F-ADB
 5F-APINACA
 AB-CHMINACA
 AB-FUBINACA
 AB-CHFUPYCA
 AB-PINACA
 ADB-CHMINACA
 ADB-FUBINACA
 ADB-PINACA
 ADBICA
 AMB-FUBINACA
 APICA
 APINACA
 MDMB-CHMICA
 MDMB-FUBINACA
 MMB-2201
 PX-3

References

Cannabinoids
Designer drugs
Organofluorides
Indazolecarboxamides